With an elevation of 3032 metres, Mount Shahjahan (Kuh-e Shahjahan) is the highest point in the Aladagh Mountains and North Khorasan Province in the northeastern part of Iran. This peak is located in the southeastern part of the Aladagh Range. The cities of Faruj and Shirvan are situated in the northeast and the north respectively, the city of Esfarayen lies in the west, and Bojnurd, the capital of North Khorasan, is in the northwest of Mount Shahjahan. Mainly formed in the Miocene and the Pliocene, Mount Shahjahan is made chiefly of Jurassic rocks.

References

Shahjahan
Landforms of North Khorasan Province
Mountains of North Khorasan Province.